The Livingston County Courthouse and Clerk's Offices, at 351 Court St. in Smithland, Kentucky, was listed on the National Register of Historic Places in 2011. It designed by Preston Grace in the Greek Revival and  Romanesque architectural styles and built in 1845. There are two associated buildings.

References

National Register of Historic Places in Livingston County, Kentucky
Greek Revival architecture in Kentucky
Romanesque Revival architecture in Kentucky
Government buildings completed in 1845
1845 establishments in Kentucky
County courthouses in Kentucky
Courthouses on the National Register of Historic Places in Kentucky
County government buildings in Kentucky
Smithland, Kentucky